Adam Seelig (born 1975) is a Canadian and American poet, playwright, director, composer and Artistic Director of One Little Goat Theatre Company in Toronto.

Theatre 
Seelig founded One Little Goat Theatre Company in New York City and Toronto in the early 2000s. With the company, he has directed dramatic works by poet-playwrights Yehuda Amichai, Thomas Bernhard, Jon Fosse, Claude Gauvreau, Luigi Pirandello, as well as his own plays, which include reinterpretations of classic material.

Seelig stages "poetic theatre." This involves "" (combining an actor's onstage persona with their offstage nature), the "prism/gap" (between actor and audience), and ambiguity. His direction "avoids naturalism."

Writing 
Beginning with the 2010 publication of Every Day in the Morning (slow), a work of "concrete lyric fiction," Seelig's writing combines aspects of the contemporary lyric with the appearance of concrete poetry. Written largely in the second person, Every Day in the Morning (slow) eschews punctuation, forming a single sentence that is at the same time a "continuous concrete-lyric-drop-poem novella."

The plays Seelig has written since 2010 employ the same drop-poem technique through which "words often align vertically, configured spatially." The format has been described by critics as "a musical score," a "poetry trick," and "eye hockey." The concrete lyric, drop-poem format allows actors to "pace and emphasize the text" as they see fit.

Music 
For Ubu Mayor, "a play with music," Seelig wrote eight songs and played piano in the band for the production premiere. The play has been referred to as an "anti-musical." For [[One Little Goat Theatre Company#Music Music Life Death Music: An Absurdical|Music Music Life Death Music: An Absurdical]], Seelig wrote seven songs and played a Fender Rhodes electric piano in the band for the production premiere. The sheet music for both of these plays is included in their print and electronic publications.

Music is foregrounded (rather than assigned to the background) in Seelig's productions. Music also plays a key role in Seelig's "drop-poem novella" Every Day in the Morning (slow), with particular emphasis on minimalist composers such as Steve Reich.David Olds, "Editor's Corner," Wholenote Magazine, Feb 2011.

 Essays 
 "Beckett's Dying Remains: The Process of Playwriting in the 'Ohio Impromptu' Manuscripts."
 "The Anonlinear Aesthetic."
 "Transcending Hyperspecificity."
 "EMERGENSEE: GET HEAD OUT OF ASS: '' and Poetic Theatre."
 Contemporary Canadian poets Seelig has reviewed or interviewed include Gregory Betts, Sylvia Legris, Donato Mancini, Lisa Robertson, Jordan Scott and playwright-novelist Sean Dixon.

 Translation 
From the Hebrew, Seelig has translated works by modern Israeli poets Yehuda Amichai, Dan Pagis and contemporary poets Navit Barel and Tehila Hakimi. With Harry Lane, he translated Someone is Going to Come by Norwegian playwright Jon Fosse.Harry Lane bio , Playwrights Canada Press.

 Education 
As an undergraduate at Stanford University, Seelig studied English Literature with John Felstiner, Marjorie Perloff and Gilbert Sorrentino, and Theatre with Carl Weber, completing a BA in 1998 with a thesis on Samuel Beckett's original manuscripts in addition to writing and directing an early play entitled Inside the Whale (named after the essay by George Orwell). Seelig founded a "nebulous, unofficial organization" known as the "Silly Society of Stanford" and seems to represent the university's "stoners and poets" in a New Yorker article that recounts his inability to identify classmate and celebrated golfer Tiger Woods.

 Background 
Seelig's early years in theatre include directorial apprenticeships at the Arts Club in Vancouver and the Tarragon Theatre in Toronto. An early poem was published in Saul Bellow and Keith Botsford's The Republic of Letters.

Born in Vancouver,A. M. Segal, "Play about national security, civil rights raises questions," Canadian Jewish News, 8 Nov 2007, p.53. Seelig is the son of an Israeli father and American mother.Michael Seelig, Professor at the School of Community and Regional Planning at the University of British Columbia (Vancouver Sun, July 18, 2014) and Julie Hurwitz, an Urban Planner for Vancouver (Queen's Quarterly, December 22, 1996.).

 Selected Plays and Publications Music Music Life Death Music: An Absurdical. Toronto: One Little Goat, 2018. (Play with music)
One Little Goat publication.  print.  e-book.
Production details. Smyth/Williams: An All-Female Staging of the Police Transcript. Toronto, 2017. (Play adaptation)
Production details.PLAY: A (Mini) History of Theatre for Kids. Toronto, 2016. (Play for children)
Production details.Ubu Mayor: A Harmful Bit of Fun. Toronto: BookThug, 2014. (Play with music)
Google Books. BookThug publication. . Print and E-book.
Production details.Parts to Whole. Toronto: BookThug, 2014. (Play)
WorldCat. BookThug publication. . Print and E-book.
Production details.Like the First Time. Toronto: BookThug, 2011. (Play)
BookThug publication. E-book.
Production details.Every Day in the Morning (slow). Vancouver: New Star Books, 2010. (Poetry/Fiction)
Google Books. New Star Books. . Print and E-book.Talking Masks (Oedipussy). Toronto: BookThug, 2009. (Play)
Google Books. BookThug publication. . Print.
Production details.Antigone:Insurgency. (Play)
Script access through Doollee.com.
Production details (2007).All Is Almost Still. (Play)
Production details (2004).H A N D S F A C E''. Toronto: Bathurst Street Press (George Murray, publisher), 2003. (Chapbook)
WorldCat. Print.

References

External links 
 Adam Seelig at One Little Goat Theatre Company
 Adam Seelig at Poetry Foundation
 Adam Seelig at BookThug

Stanford University alumni
Canadian theatre directors
Writers from Toronto
Jewish poets
Jewish Canadian writers
Canadian male dramatists and playwrights
21st-century Canadian poets
Canadian male poets
21st-century Canadian dramatists and playwrights
Jewish dramatists and playwrights
1975 births
Living people
21st-century Canadian male writers